The Princess Theatre in Torquay, England is a 1,500 seat theatre that first opened its doors on Wednesday 7 June 1961. Top of the bill on opening night were Tommy Cooper and Morecambe & Wise.

The theatre is a touring house and shows a variety of productions including opera, ballet, concerts, wrestling, ice shows & West End musicals and a Christmas pantomime.

The theatre was built by Torbay Council as the main feature of the redevelopment of the Princess Gardens area on Torquay seafront. The theatre replaced a marquee which was erected annually to house light entertainment.

Theatres in seaside resorts are traditionally known for their annual Summer Season consisting of light entertainment and family variety shows and Torquay is no exception. In the past the Princess Theatre has seen artistes such as Jim Davidson, Jethro and Jimmy Cricket making regular appearances. However summer 2002 saw a change from the traditional line-up to a 6-week run consisting of two West End musicals Grease and Chicago. Summer 2003 saw a similar occurrence, featuring The Blues Brothers, Joseph and the Amazing Technicolor Dreamcoat and Boogie Nights, with musicals proving to be a popular choice for the local people of Torbay as well as the holidaymakers.

The Princess Theatre hosts musicals from two local groups; TOADS Stage Musical Company and TOPS.

Shows

External links
 Official Website

Theatres in Devon
Buildings and structures in Torquay